Richard Adam Logan (born 18 February 1988) is an English professional football forward who played in the Football League for Darlington.

Career
He began his career as a trainee with Darlington. He made his league debut as a 16-year-old substitute on 5 March 2005, as a second-half substitute for Keith Gilroy in a 1–0 win at home to Bury.

In need of the first-team experience, he was allowed to join Workington on loan in September 2005. Still on the outside of Darlington's first team squad, he joined Gateshead on loan in September 2006.

He was released by Darlington in January 2007- ,

He then went on to sign for the Virginia Beach Mariners, managed by former Northern Ireland international Colin Clarke. He subsequently moved to Sweden to play for Ostevalls before signing for Conference North side Blyth Spartans on 5 October 2007.

In 2009, he was playing for Consett. From Consett he moved on to Sunderland RCA where he had a good season, he went on to play for Shildon for the 2011–12 season. During pre-season for Shildon, he suffered a cruciate ligament injury ruling him out until the 2013 season.

References

External links

1988 births
Living people
People from Washington, Tyne and Wear
Footballers from Tyne and Wear
English footballers
Association football forwards
Darlington F.C. players
Workington A.F.C. players
Gateshead F.C. players
Virginia Beach Mariners players
Blyth Spartans A.F.C. players
Consett A.F.C. players
Sunderland Ryhope Community Association F.C. players
Shildon A.F.C. players
English Football League players
National League (English football) players
Northern Football League players
English expatriate sportspeople in the United States
Expatriate soccer players in the United States
English expatriate footballers